"Go to Sleep" is a song by the English rock band Radiohead, released as the second single from their sixth studio album Hail to the Thief (2003) on 18 August 2003. It reached number two on the Canadian Singles Chart, number nine on the Italian Singles Chart, and number 12 on the UK Singles Chart.

Composition
"Go to Sleep" is composed in alternating bars of 4/4 and 6/4. It features a processed "stuttering" guitar sound created by Jonny Greenwood. Radiohead released a live version, recorded in Osaka, for the War Child charity in 2004.

Music video
A CGI animated music video was released for "Go to Sleep", directed by Alex Rutterford. It depicts the singer, Thom Yorke, sitting in a park while people in business suits walk by rapidly. The classical buildings spontaneously crumble and reassemble themselves in modern in style.

Track listings

UK versions
CD 1 CDR6613
 "Go to Sleep"
 "I Am Citizen Insane"
 "Fog (Again)" (Live)

CD 2 CDRS6613
 "Go to Sleep"
 "Gagging Order"
 "I Am a Wicked Child"

12" 12R6613
 "Go to Sleep"
 "I Am Citizen Insane"
 "I Am a Wicked Child"

US version
CD 52953 released 3 September 2003 by Capitol Records
 "Go to Sleep"
 "Gagging Order"
 "I Am a Wicked Child"

7" R-19218
 "Go to Sleep"
 "I Am Citizen Insane"

Canada version
CD
 "Go to Sleep"
 "I Am Citizen Insane"
 "Fog (Again)" (Live)

Personnel
Thom Yorke – vocals, guitar
Jonny Greenwood – guitar, laptop, toy piano
Ed O'Brien – guitar, backing vocals
Colin Greenwood – bass
Philip Selway – drums, backing vocals

Charts

Release history

References

Radiohead songs
2003 singles
Capitol Records singles
Parlophone singles
Song recordings produced by Nigel Godrich
Songs written by Thom Yorke
Songs written by Colin Greenwood
Songs written by Jonny Greenwood
Songs written by Philip Selway
Songs written by Ed O'Brien
2003 songs